Orocué is a town and municipality in the Department of Casanare, Colombia, located on the shore of the Meta River. Historically, it went by the name San Miguel del Macuco.

It is located 180 km from Yopal, and 546 km from Bogotá.

Climate
Orocué has a tropical savanna climate (Köppen Aw) with moderate to little rainfall from December to March and heavy rainfall from April to November.

See also 
Orocue Airport

References

External links 
Municipio de Orocué - Official website

Municipalities of Casanare Department